Alice Arlen (November 6, 1940 – February 29, 2016) was an American screenwriter, best known for Silkwood (1983), which she wrote with Nora Ephron. Her other film credits include the scripts of Alamo Bay (1985), Cookie (1989), The Weight of Water (2000) and Then She Found Me (2007).

Early life 
In 1940, Arlen was born as Alice Reeve. Arlen's father was Jay Frederick Reeve, a lawyer. Arlen's mother was Josephine Medill Patterson, a journalist. After Arlen's mother married Ivan Albright, Arlen and her brother Joseph took the surname of Albright.

Education 
In 1962, Arlene graduated from Radcliffe College of Harvard University. In 1981, Arlene earned an  MFA degree from the Columbia University School of the Arts.

Career
Arlen worked for CBS. Arlen met Nora Ephron, with whom she wrote the screenplay for Silkwood (1983), for which they were nominated for an Oscar for Best Original Screenplay. Arlen worked with director Louis Malle, writing the script for Alamo Bay (1985). Arlen and Ephron later worked together on Cookie (1989), which was directed by Susan Seidelman. Later, Arlen also wrote the screenplay for The Weight of Water (2000), and Helen Hunt's first feature film as director, Then She Found Me (2007).

Filmography 
 Silkwood (with Nora Ephron) (1983)
 Alamo Bay (1985)
 Cookie (with Nora Ephron) (1989) (also Executive Producer)
 A Shock to the System (Associate Producer) (1990)
 The Weight of Water (with Christopher Kyle) (2000)
 A Thief of Time (2004) (TV)
 Then She Found Me (with Victor Levin and Helen Hunt) (2007)

Personal life 
Arlen married James Hoge. They had three children. In 1971,  Arlen divorced. In 1972, Arlen married Michael J. Arlen and later moved to New York.

In 2016, Arlen died at her home in Manhattan, New York. She was 75 years old.

Family tree

References

External links

1940 births
2016 deaths
American women screenwriters
American women journalists
Writers from Chicago
Journalists from Illinois
Columbia University School of the Arts alumni
Radcliffe College alumni
Medill-Patterson family
Writers from Manhattan
Albright family
Screenwriters from New York (state)
Screenwriters from Illinois